The Tecma Mambo is a French high-wing, single-place, hang glider designed and produced by Tecma Sport of Saint-Pierre-en-Faucigny, first produced in 1994. The aircraft is supplied complete and ready-to-fly.

Design and development
The Mambo was designed for recreational flying. It is made from aluminum tubing, with the double-surface wing covered in 4 oz Dacron sailcloth. Its wing is cable braced from a single kingpost. The nose angle is 124° for all models and a Mylar leading edge is optional.

The models are each named for their wing area in square metres and decimals of square metres.

Variants
Mambo 135
Small-sized model for lighter pilots. Its  span wing is cable braced from a single kingpost.
Mambo 160
Mid-sized model for medium weight pilots. Its  span wing is cable braced from a single kingpost.
Mambo 160
Large-sized model for heavier pilots. Its  span wing is cable braced from a single kingpost.

Specifications (Mambo 135)

References

External links
 Official website

Mambo
Hang gliders